Kim Sang-hoon (born 8 June 1973) is a football coach and former player from South Korea.

Club career
Kim has spent most of his club career playing for Ulsan Hyundai Horangi.

International career
Kim frequently represented South Korea between 1995 and 1999. He has played in 1996 Summer Olympics.

Managerial career 
Kim is currently the Head Coach of the Matao, Guam National Team - his first time at the helm of the team. Kim initially returned to Guam in 2020 to serve as Technical Director at Guam FA and Head Coach of Masakåda, Guam Women's National Team before taking on the role of Head Coach of the Guam Men's National Team in late 2021. He had been appointed Guam women's national football team manager from 2014 to 2015. His first stint at the helm of the team was from 2006 to 2009.

References

External links
 
 

1973 births
Living people
Association football defenders
South Korean footballers
South Korea international footballers
Ulsan Hyundai FC players
Pohang Steelers players
Seongnam FC players
K League 1 players
Footballers at the 1996 Summer Olympics
Olympic footballers of South Korea
Soongsil University alumni
South Korean expatriate football managers
Guam national football team managers
South Korean expatriate sportspeople in Guam
South Korean football managers